Notohippus is an extinct genus of notoungulate mammal from the Early Miocene (Santacrucian in the SALMA classification) Santa Cruz Formation, Río Bote, Argentina.

Description 
Notohippus had high crowned teeth with cementum, similar to the situation of grazing equids.

References 

Toxodonts
Miocene mammals of South America
Santacrucian
Neogene Argentina
Fossils of Argentina
Fossil taxa described in 1891
Taxa named by Florentino Ameghino
Prehistoric placental genera
Austral or Magallanes Basin
Santa Cruz Formation